Duboisius is a genus of antlike flower beetles in the family Anthicidae. There are about five described species in Duboisius.

Species
These five species belong to the genus Duboisius:
 Duboisius arizonensis (Champion, 1916)
 Duboisius barri Abdullah, 1964
 Duboisius brevicornis Abdullah, 1964
 Duboisius texanus Abdullah, 1961
 Duboisius wickenburgiensis Abdullah, 1961

References

Further reading

 
 

Anthicidae
Articles created by Qbugbot